Fahey is a surname derived from the Irish surname Ó Fathaigh.  Alternative spellings include Fahie, Fahy and Fay. Notable people with the surname include:

Brandon Fahey, American baseball player
Brian Fahey (composer), British musical director
Brian Fahey (ice hockey), American ice hockey player
Charles P. Fahey (c. 1860 – 1913) American labor leader and politician
Claire Fahey (born 1991), British real tennis player
David M. Fahey, American professor of history
Denis Fahey, Catholic priest
Edward Henry Fahey (1844–1907), English artist
Eugene M. Fahey (born 1951), American judge
Frank Fahey, Irish politician
James Charles Fahey (1903–1974), American author and publisher
Jeff Fahey, American actor
John Fahey (musician), American guitarist and composer
John Fahey (politician), Australian politician
John M. Fahey, Jr., president and chief executive officer of the National Geographic Society
Joseph Fahey, American Roman Catholic theologian
Julie Fahey, American politician 
Katie Fahey, American activist
Keith Fahey (born 1983), Irish footballer
Mary-Anne Fahey, Australian actor, comedian and writer
Mike Fahey, American mayor
Myrna Fahey (1933–1973), American actress
Nancy Fahey (born 1958), American basketball coach
Robert Fahey, Australian real tennis player
Siobhan Fahey (born 1958), Irish singer and musician
Terry Fahey, Australian rugby league footballer

See also
 Fahy (surname)
 Fahie

Anglicised Irish-language surnames